Whyte notation is a classification method for steam locomotives, and some internal combustion locomotives and electric locomotives, by wheel arrangement. It was devised by Frederick Methvan Whyte, and came into use in the early twentieth century following a December 1900 editorial in American Engineer and Railroad Journal.

The notation was adopted and remains in use in North America and the United Kingdom to describe the wheel arrangements of steam locomotives, but for modern locomotives, multiple units and trams it has been supplanted by the UIC system in Europe and by the AAR system (essentially a simplification of the UIC system) in North America.

Structure of the system

Basic form 
The notation in its basic form counts the number of leading wheels, then the number of driving wheels, and finally the number of trailing wheels, numbers being separated by dashes. For example, a locomotive with two leading axles (four wheels) in front, then three driving axles (six wheels) and then one trailing axle (two wheels) is classified as a  locomotive, and is commonly known as a Pacific.

Denotion of other locomotives

Articulated locomotives 
For articulated locomotives that have two wheelsets, such as Garratts, which are effectively two locomotives joined by a common boiler, each wheelset is denoted separately, with a plus sign (+) between them. For Garratt locomotives, the plus sign is used even when there are no intermediate unpowered wheels, e.g. the LMS Garratt . This is because the two engine units are more than just power bogies. They are complete engines, carrying fuel and water tanks. The plus sign represents the bridge (carrying the boiler) that links the two engines.

Simpler articulated types, such as Mallets, have a jointed frame under a common boiler where there are no unpowered wheels between the sets of powered wheels. Typically, the forward frame is free to swing, whereas the rear frame is rigid with the boiler. Sometimes articulated locomotives of this type are denoted with a “+” between each driving wheels set (so in the previous case, the big boy would be a 4-8+8-4). This may have been developed to distinguish articulated and duplex arrangements; duplex arrangements would get a “-“ being rigid and articulated locomotives would get a “+” being flexible. However, given all the wheel arrangements for duplex locomotives have been mutually exclusive to them, it is usually considered unnecessary and thus another “-“ is usually used.

Triplex locomotives, and any theoretical larger ones, simply expand on basic articulated locomotives, for example, 2-8-8-8-2. In the case of the Belgium quadruplex, the arrangement is listed as 0-6-2+2-4-2-4-2+0-6-2.

Duplex locomotives 
For duplex locomotives, which have two sets of coupled driving wheels mounted rigidly on the same frame, the same method is used as for Mallet articulated locomotives – the amount of leading wheels are placed first, followed by the leading set of driving wheels, followed by the trailing set of driving wheels, followed by the trailing wheels, each number being separated by a hyphen.

Tank locomotives 
A number of standard suffixes can be used to extend the Whyte notation for tank locomotives:

Other steam locomotives 
Various other types of steam locomotive can be also denoted through suffixes:

Internal combustion locomotives 

The wheel arrangement of small diesel and petrol locomotives can be classified using the same notation as steam locomotives, e.g. 0-4-0, 0-6-0, 0-8-0. Where the axles are coupled by chains or shafts (rather than side rods) or are individually driven, the terms 4w (4-wheeled), 6w (6-wheeled) or 8w (8-wheeled) are generally used. For larger locomotives, the UIC classification is more commonly used.

Various suffixes are also used to denote the different types of internal combustion locomotives:

Electric locomotives 
The wheel arrangement of small electric locomotives can be denoted using this notation, like with internal combustion locomotives.

Suffixes used for Electric locomotives include:

Wheel arrangement names 
In American (and to a lesser extent British) practice, most wheel arrangements in common use were given names, sometimes from the name of the first such locomotive built. For example, the 2-2-0 type arrangement is named Planet, after the 1830 locomotive on which it was first used. (This naming convention is similar to the naming of warship classes.)

Common wheel arrangements 
The most common wheel arrangements are listed below. In the diagrams, the front of the locomotive is to the left.

See also 
 AAR wheel arrangement
 Swiss locomotive and railcar classification
 UIC classification
 Wheel arrangement

References

Further reading

External links 
 

In the various names above of a 4-8-4, omitted was the letters "F E F" which simply means: four eight four.

 
Locomotive classification systems
 
Notation

de:Achsformel#Whyte-Notation
it:Rodiggio